9th Summit of the Non-Aligned Movement on 4–7 September 1989 in Belgrade, SR Serbia, SFR Yugoslavia was the conference of Heads of State or Government of the Non-Aligned Movement. Belgrade was the first city to host the Summit for the second time after it hosted the 1st Summit of the Non-Aligned Movement in 1961. Yugoslavia was unanimously selected as the host of the Summit at the 1988 Non-Aligned Foreign Ministers Conference in Nicosia, Cyprus. While the Federal Secretary of Foreign Affairs of Yugoslavia led by Budimir Lončar was excited, the Presidency of Yugoslavia, Yugoslav collective head of state, was skeptical about the prospects of hosting the event but ultimately supported it by Josip Vrhovec in fear that rejection may show the level of the crisis in the country. The comparatively weak federal government organizers of the event ultimately hoped that the conference may convince leaders of the strong Yugoslav federal republics to resolve the early Yugoslav crisis in a constructive and peaceful way, yet it nevertheless escalated in 1991 Yugoslav Wars. The event is therefore sometimes described as the swan song of the prominent Yugoslav Cold War diplomacy. Summit took place at the Sava Centar in New Belgrade. Janez Drnovšek held the opening remarks in Slovenian language.

At the Summit, Yugoslavia succeeded in persuading members states to exclude anti-American and anti-Western positions from the final document which also avoided harsh criticism of Israel and Zionism and for the first time explicitly included human rights and freedom as well as women's rights provisions. Yugoslavia nevertheless welcomed Yasser Arafat as the President of Palestine and not as the head of the Palestine Liberation Organization. Unsatisfied with the host's anti-radicalism more radical members of the movement such as Iraq, Iran and Cuba sent lower-ranking officials at lead their delegations in Belgrade. Career diplomat and the last Yugoslav representative the United Nations Darko Šilović was responsible for the organization of the Summit. Novi Sad Fair, Belgrade Fair and Zagreb Fair all proposed exhibitions related to NAM during the event while the Yugoslav Lexicographical Institute in Zagreb proposed scientific and cultural symposium on the NAM with numerous other economic and cultural events taking place all around Yugoslavia. Delegates at the conference planted trees at the New Belgrade Park of Friendship.

References

See also
 Yugoslavia and the Non-Aligned Movement
 50th Anniversary Additional Commemorative Non-Aligned Meeting
 60th Anniversary Additional Commemorative Non-Aligned Meeting

Summit 9th
Foreign relations of Yugoslavia
Non-Aligned Movement, 9th Summit of the
Non-Aligned Movement, 9th Summit of the
Non-Aligned Movement, 9th Summit of the
Non-Aligned Movement, 9th Summit of the
Non-Aligned Movement, 9th Summit of the